Premier Loyalty & Marketing, S.A.P.I. de C.V. operating as Club Premier is a loyalty program based in Mexico, originally the frequent flyer program of Aeroméxico, the Mexican airline, now spun off and operated by PLM, which is 51% owned by Aeroméxico and 49% by AIMIA, the Montreal-based loyalty company with its origins as the frequent flyer program of Air Canada.

History of ownership structure
In September 2010, AIMIA, formerly Groupe Aeroplan, acquired approximately 29 percent of Club Premier for 35 million US dollars. Club Premier was spun off from Aeroméxico and to do this Grupo Aeroméxico and Groupe Aeroplan created the company Premier Loyalty & Marketing, S.A.P.I. de C.V. ("PLM") to operate Club Premier. 

In December 2012, Groupe Aeroplan invested another 88 million USD to acquire an additional 20% of PLM, so that now, AIMIA controls 49% of PLM and Aeroméxico controls 51%.

Members
Club Premier has more than 7.5 million members. Members can earn points with Aeroméxico, SkyTeam airlines, Alaska, LAN and Copa Airlines, as well as with affiliated hotel chains and car rental companies, Soriana hypermarkets and other retailers.

Club Premier also has more than 90 partners, some like Uber, Linio, Cadillac, etc.

Club Premier has co-branded consumer credit cards with American Express, Santander Mexico and U.S. Bank (USA).

Gallery 
Below are the National, International and Heineken lounges in Mexico City International Airport:

References

External links
Official website (US English version)

Customer loyalty programs
Frequent flyer programs
Aeroméxico
Aimia (company)